Panayiotis Alexiou "Peter" Vagenas (born February 6, 1978) is an American former soccer player.

High school and college
Vagenas graduated from Saint Francis High School in La Cañada Flintridge, class of 1996, where he played for coach Glen Appels and captained the team to a CIF Southern Section Championship his senior year, as well as being named CIF SS divisional player of the year. Vagenas played club soccer for Afshin Ghotbi. He played college soccer at UCLA from 1996 to 1999, leading them to the NCAA title in 1997, and finished his career there with 15 goals and 30 assists in 82 games. He was elected team MVP during his campaign at UCLA.

Career

Professional
Vagenas was drafted by Los Angeles Galaxy in the second round of the 2000 MLS SuperDraft and subsequently spent nine years with the team, winning the U.S. Open Cup in 2001 and 2005, and the MLS Cup in 2002 and 2005, captaining the team to the 2005 double. Vagenas missed most of 2007 and 2008 due to injury, but during his time with Galaxy he scored 14 goals and 12 assists in 183 league appearances, plus added two goals and two assists in the playoffs. He was a fan favorite with Galaxy due to his energetic play and local roots (earning him the nickname "Pasadena Pete").

On November 26, 2008, Vagenas was selected by Seattle Sounders FC in the 2008 MLS Expansion Draft.

After two seasons with Seattle, Vagenas was traded to Colorado Rapids on November 22, 2010. After the trade Colorado declined Vagenas's contract option and he elected to participate in the 2010 MLS Re-Entry Draft.

Vagenas became a free agent in Major League Soccer when he was not selected in the Re-Entry draft; after a couple of months out of the game he signed for expansion side Vancouver Whitecaps FC in April 2011. At season's end, Vancouver declined his 2012 contract option and he entered the 2011 MLS Re-Entry Draft. Vagenas was not selected in the draft and became a free agent.

He was signed by Chivas USA on February 22, 2012. His contract expired after 2012 and he made himself eligible for the 2012 MLS Re-Entry Draft in December 2012. Vagenas became a free agent after he went undrafted in both rounds of the draft.

International
Vagenas played for the United States in the 2000 Summer Olympics, scoring three goals, all on penalty kicks. He earned his first cap for the senior national team on October 25, 2000 against Mexico, but injuries have curtailed his appearances at the international level. He has earned three caps to date. He was also the captain and leading scorer in the 1999 Pan American Games in Canada for the USA national team.

Statistics

Personal life
Peter was born to Alex and Tassia Vagenas. He and his three siblings, George, Theoni and Dino were raised in Pasadena, California. Vagenas now resides in Pasadena along with his wife Mindy.

Honors

Los Angeles Galaxy
CONCACAF Champions' Cup (1): 2000
Lamar Hunt U.S. Open Cup (2): 2001, 2005
Major League Soccer MLS Cup (2): 2002, 2005
Major League Soccer Supporters' Shield (1): 2002
Major League Soccer Western Conference Championship (2): 2002, 2005

Seattle Sounders FC
Lamar Hunt U.S. Open Cup (1): 2009

References

External links

1978 births
Living people
American soccer players
Sportspeople from Pasadena, California
American people of Greek descent
Soccer players from California
UCLA Bruins men's soccer players
University of California, Los Angeles alumni
LA Galaxy players
Seattle Sounders FC players
Vancouver Whitecaps FC players
Chivas USA players
United States men's international soccer players
Olympic soccer players of the United States
Footballers at the 2000 Summer Olympics
Expatriate soccer players in Canada
LA Galaxy draft picks
Major League Soccer players
United States men's under-23 international soccer players
Association football midfielders
Pan American Games bronze medalists for the United States
Pan American Games medalists in football
Footballers at the 1999 Pan American Games